Aleksandr Anatolyevich Tarasov (born 7 March 1972) is a former Russian football player.

Tarasov was a product of FC Torpedo Moscow's youth academy, and made 5 appearances for the club in the 1989 USSR Federation Cup, including the 0–2 quarter-final defeat to FC Dnepr Dnepropetrovsk. He also made a single appearance for Torpedo in the 1992 Russian Top League, playing in the final round match.

References

External links
 

1972 births
Living people
Soviet footballers
Russian footballers
FC Torpedo Moscow players
FC Torpedo-2 players
Russian Premier League players
Russian expatriate footballers
Expatriate footballers in Moldova
Association football defenders
FC FShM Torpedo Moscow players
FC Lukhovitsy players